Hexurella pinea is a species of spider native to the United States. It was first described by Gertsch and Platnick in 1979. It is from the family Hexurellidae.

References

Mygalomorphae
Spiders of the United States
Spiders described in 1979